Merlo may refer to:

 Merlo (company), a manufacturer of telescopic handlers based in Italy
 Merlo Partido, Buenos Aires Province, Argentina
 Merlo, Buenos Aires, head town of Merlo Partido
 Deportivo Merlo, football team based here
 Merlo Station High School, in Beaverton, Oregon
 Villa de Merlo, San Luis Province, Argentina

People with the surname
 Beatrice Merlo
 Carmelo Merlo
 Claudio Merlo
 Enrica Merlo
 Enrique Gorriarán Merlo
 Francisco de Merlo
 Francisco López de Osornio Merlo
 Gastón Merlo
 Gianni Merlo
 Giuseppe Merlo
 Harry Merlo
 Ismael Merlo
 Jaime Jiménez Merlo
 Janet Merlo
 Jim Merlo
 Johann Jakob Merlo
 John Merlo
 Larry Merlo
 Liliana Merlo
 Luis Merlo
 Madeline Merlo
 María Luisa Merlo
 Maria Teresa Merlo
 Michele Merlo (cyclist)
 Michele Merlo (singer)
 Miguel Antonio de Merlo
 Mike Merlo
 Nelson Merlo
 Néstor Merlo
 Omar Merlo
 Paul Merlo 
 Reinaldo Merlo
 Rick Merlo
 Yoan "ToD" Merlo
 Carmen García de Merlo

See also
 Merlot